Dave Russell managed Tranmere Rovers F.C. to promotion in 1966–67. Tranmere had narrowly failed to win promotion in the previous two years and newcomers included Barry Ashworth and Graham Williams, while young players Jim Cumbes and Roy McFarland established regular first-team slots. Rovers were early pace-setters after losing just one of their first 15 games, including a 5–0 victory over Crewe Alexandra. George Yardley was signed from Luton Town, then George Hudson arrived from Northampton. Four successive wins maintained Tranmere's promotion challenge and they finished fourth after losing only two of their last 12 games.

Final league table

References 

 

 

Tranmere Rovers F.C. seasons
Tranmere Rovers